The Boulevard Mohamed-Khemisti, named after former foreign minister Mohamed Khemisti, is a major artery and public space in Algiers.

Geography
The boulevard runs upwards from east to west, starting near the seashore and ending at the esplanade in front of the Government Palace. It is divided into three sections: a northern boulevard, a middle section of plazas and gardens, and a southern boulevard.

The area is served by the Tafourah - Grande Poste station of the Algiers Metro.

History

The boulevard was created on the location of former fortifications built by the French colonial regime following the destruction of the eastern ramparts of the city at the level of the fort of Bab Azoun and the extension of the urbanization in the direction of the suburb of Agha. It was then named for Édouard Laferrière, a distinguished jurist who had died in mid-1901 shortly after the end of his service as French Governor-General of Algeria. The development included several public buildings, namely a customs administration building (completed in 1908), the Grande Poste d'Alger, and the Government Palace.

Gallery

See also
 Martyrs' Square, Tripoli
 Mohammed V Square

Notes

Geography of Algiers